Warwick railway station is a railway station on the Transperth network. It is located on the Joondalup line,  from Perth station serving the suburb of Warwick.

History
Prior to the commissioning of the site as a railway station, the location was originally a bus interchange known as the Warwick Bus Station. Opened in 1987, it was similar in design and appearance to facilities constructed at Mirrabooka and Rockingham for the same purpose. It provided services connecting the Perth central business district to bus routes servicing the then rapidly expanding northern suburbs. The site also contains a privately operated day care centre which remains in operation as of September 2019.

The original bus station was connected to the adjoining Mitchell Freeway by a two-lane on/off ramp in both the north and south directions, constructed in the middle of the Mitchell Freeway reserve. It was constructed to service freeway express buses from Perth, services which were subsequently phased out with the opening of the railway station. The on/off ramp was connected to the bus station via a bridge spanning the southbound lanes of the Freeway. The bus station was positioned on land north of the connecting bridge between the Freeway East Embankment (controlled by the Main Roads Department), Hawker Avenue, land occupied by the Warwick chapel of the Church of Jesus Christ of Latter-day Saints, and adjoining residential housing.

Design and construction
At the time of the station's design, it was recognised by The Urban Rail Electrification Committee that the placement of bus services in close proximity or direct connection to rail infrastructure was of significant importance. This was evidenced by the Kelmscott and Armadale stations, and the then recently completed Cannington station.

Under the Northern Suburbs Transit System Project, construction on the station was scheduled to commence on 16 November 1991, with completion expected by the end of December 1992. Whitfords station being of a very similar design was scheduled for construction in synchronisation with Warwick station.

The station was to include a number of facilities, including a bus concourse to connect with feeder bus services, information booths and offices for railway staff, amenities and services, as well as access services for mobility-impaired passengers in line with design requirements of the time. Further to this, pieces of the Passenger Information Network installed at the station included previously unseen electronic displays on the upper bus decks designed to provide drivers with information so they could connect with appointed trains or communicate with bus depot control in the event of delays. Passenger information systems across the network were upgraded as part of the improvements under the New MetroRail Project.

Car parking spaces were also included as part of the construction project, which included a significant number  of on-grade parking bays on the eastern side of the station for commuter use.

The design of the station also allowed for the possible extension of the upper bus deck in a southward direction towards Beach Road. This extension would provide for five additional regular bus bays, as well as additional pedestrian access if required.

As part of the construction of the new railway station the on/off ramps used for buses were demolished; however the original bridge over the southbound lanes was retained to provide upper-level bus station access. A pedestrian pathway was added to the bridge to enable pedestrian movements across to the easy side of the station from a new footbridge linking to Methuen Way, Duncraig.

The most interesting part of the station was the upper bus deck. The deck was constructed of precast concrete that was formed off site, which was then transported to the site before being placed atop columns constructed as part of the stations foundations. Precast concrete flooring was then put in place, held in specially formed ridges running the length of the beams. This upper deck was the most expensive structural element of the station, and was the cause of significant attention and consideration as part of the design and construction process.

Warwick station opened on 28 February 1993.

Demolition and associated works

Once the new railway station including the bus concourse had opened, the old transfer station was demolished. The costs of demolition for the existing station were not included as part of the construction budget for the new railway station. The land resulting from the demolition of the transfer station was then converted into additional commuter car parking space, bringing the available number of bays up to 830.

After construction
In 2003, the contract for extending the platforms on seven Joondalup line stations, including Warwick station, was awarded to Lakis Constructions. Along with the extensions, the platform edges were upgraded to bring them into line with tactile paving standards. Work on this station began in early 2004, and was complete by July 2004.

Services
Warwick station is served by Transperth Joondalup line services.

Platforms
Platforms currently in use are as follows:

Bus routes

References

External links

Joondalup line
Railway stations in Perth, Western Australia
Railway stations in Australia opened in 1993
Transperth railway stations in highway medians
Bus stations in Perth, Western Australia